Alexander Volzhin (born 2 February 1971; Russian: Александр Волжин) is a Russian chess grandmaster.

Chess career
Alexander Volzhin was born on 2 February 1971 in the southern Russian city of Makhachkala. He started playing chess when he was 5 years old. Volzhin was awarded the title of chess grandmaster in 1997.
Notable tournament results include:
 Capablanca Memorial, Varadero (Cuba), 2000 - 1st place
 Bergen (Norway), 2000 - 1st place
 Dhaka (Bangladesh), 2001 - tied for 1st place (with Jaan Ehlvest)
 Ljubljana (Slovenia), 1999 - tied for 1st place
 Lausanne (Switzerland), 2000 - tied for 2nd place

In addition to playing, Volzhin has been a coach of a number of outstanding players, including Evgeny Bareev, Almira Skripchenko, Ekaterina Kovalevskaya, and Iweta Rajlich. Also, Volzhin has been a coach of the Russian national women's team during Chess Olympiads in Elista in 1998 (under the head coach Naum Rashkovsky, silver medal) and in Istanbul in 2000 (under the head coach Yuri Yakovich, bronze medal).

Notable Games
 Volzhin - Miles, Cappelle-La-Grande, 1999
 Volzhin - Oral, Capablanca Memorial, 2000
 Ulybin - Volzhin, Dubai, 2002
 Volzhin - Vaganian, Russian Team Championship, 2005
 Rahman - Volzhin, Dhaka 2001

Anti-Cheating Activism
Alexander Volzhin has been an outspoken fighter for integrity of professional chess. His article in the 64 Chess Magazine was one of the first on the issue of computer cheating when a player gets illegal help from computer engines. He also exposed a number of players involved in game fixing and pumping up their ratings.

Business career
After retirement from international chess in early 2000s, Volzhin pursued career in business. Since 2007, he has worked for Barclays in London rising through the ranks to the position of a vice-president at Barclays Capital, the securities division of Barclays plc.

References

External links 

Alexander Volzhin chess games at 365Chess.com

Chess grandmasters
Chess coaches
Russian chess players
1971 births
Living people
People from Makhachkala